Somrit Ornsomjit (Thai สมฤทธิ์ อ่อนสมจิตร) is a Thai former professional footballer and played for Thailand national football team.

Somrit represented Thailand at the 1994 Asian Games.

References

Somrit Ornsomjit
1970 births
Living people
Association football forwards
Footballers at the 1994 Asian Games
Somrit Ornsomjit